is a  Sōtō Zen Buddhist temple located in the city of Obama, Fukui, Japan. It is one of the few surviving provincial temples established by Emperor Shōmu during the Nara period (710 – 794). Due to this connection, the temple grounds were designated as a National Historic Site in 1976. It is located about 20 minutes on foot from Higashi-Obama Station on the JR West Obama Line.

Background

History
The Wakasa Kokubun-ji is located on the alluvial plain of the Kitagawa River, approximately 4.5 kilometers east of the modern city centre of Obama. An archaeological excavation was conducted since 1972, indicating that the present temple overlaps the Nara period temple, which was built on a scale slightly smaller than other provincial temples, with compound 230 meters square. The exact date of construction is unknown, but is believed to be around 741 AD based on records indicating that the structures of Taikō-ji,  pre-existing family temple of a local clan, was relocated to this site to create the Wakasa Kokubun-ji. The original temple was rebuilt in the Heian period with a slightly different building plan, and in a record dating 1603, the date of construction is given as 807 AD. No roof tiles have been found at the site, which is unusual for a provincial temple. The temple is mentioned in Heian period and Kamakura period records, although mention of its associated provincial nunnery disappear after 1265 AD, and the exact site of the nunnery is now unknown.

In 1611, a Shako-dō was constructed on the site of the original Kondō. This building was rebuilt in 1705.

Precincts
The current precincts consist of the Shako-dō, a 5 x 5 bay building in the irimoya-style containing the temple's honzon Shaka Nyorai. Both the building and the statue are Obama City Designated Tangible Cultural Properties. To the west of the Shako-dō is the Yakushi-dō, containing a Yakushi Nyorai flanked by Shaka Nyorai and Amida Nyorai. The Edo period Yakushi Nyorai is from the now-vanished provincial nunnery, and is an Important Cultural Property. The other two statues are both Obama City Designated Tangible Cultural Properties.

Also within the grounds is a large circular kofun tumulus, with a diameter of approximately 50 meters. One of the largest in the Wakasa region, it dates from the 6th century.

Gallery

See also
List of Historic Sites of Japan (Fukui)
provincial temple

References

External links

Fukui Prefectural Cultural Sites 
Obama City official home page 
Cultural sites in Wakasa Province

Buddhist temples in Fukui Prefecture
Historic Sites of Japan
Obama, Fukui
Echizen Province
Important Cultural Properties of Japan
Wooden buildings and structures in Japan
8th-century establishments in Japan
Nara period
8th-century Buddhist temples
Religious buildings and structures completed in 1705
741 establishments
Religious organizations established in the 8th century
Soto temples